Red or Black? is a British television game show which was broadcast on ITV between 3 September 2011 and 29 September 2012.

In each round, contestants choose red or black, with those that choose the incorrect colour being eliminated. During the first series, four finalists guessed the colour correctly in the final round and became millionaires. Over 100,000 members of the public applied to be on the show, with the numbers being reduced down to a different final eight contestants per live show each night for seven nights. Whilst most rounds varied, there were two standard rounds in each live final: "Duel" where the final two contestants went head to head, and the final round where the winner chose a colour on a giant wheel similar to that used in roulette. Celebrities including Jedward, David Hasselhoff and One Direction were involved in the rounds of the show where contestants must choose either red or black in order to pass to the next round, while the show was filmed at locations such as Battersea Power Station and the set of Coronation Street.

Red or Black? was commissioned for a second series, which featured the format having been revamped significantly. While the first series featured six pre-recorded rounds in several different locations and four live rounds, the second series featured six pre-recorded rounds that take place in either the Red or Black? Arena or in the studio. Celebrities such as Carol Vorderman, Jonathan Ross and Little Mix were involved in the rounds for this series.

The show is a joint production between Syco TV and ITV Studios, and was initially broadcast on ITV nightly over the course of seven nights from Saturday to the following Saturday, with the exception of the Tuesday night. The show also featured several Syco-related music acts. Sponsorship for the first series was initially targeted at National Lottery operator Camelot Group, but eventually went with Jackpotjoy owner Gamesys and Domino's Pizza. The second series was sponsored by controversial loans site wonga.com.

In the week where the first series of Red or Black? aired, ITV gained a much larger audience share than it had in the week directly previous, where it had been beaten by BBC One on six out of seven nights. Despite this, reviews of the first series were universally negative, and additional criticism was leveled at the show when it was discovered that Nathan Hageman, the first winner of the £1m prize, had a criminal record. This led to ITV dropping three other contestants from the show, with at least one withdrawn because of their criminal record. This was also a major factor in the pre-recording of series 2.

Production
An initial pilot of the show was ordered in 2003 by ITV, from production company FremantleMedia, and was commissioned by Claudia Rosencrantz, who was the controller of entertainment at ITV at the time. It was presented by Brian Conley, but was not broadcast; a series was not produced. Rosencrantz spoke of the pilot in 2011, "I didn't believe people would like to see someone win a vast sum of money, with no skills at all involved. Second, gambling is not a spectator sport, you get an adrenaline rush from participating in it." Richard Holloway, who worked with FremantleMedia at the time of producing the pilot, said, "It was a novel idea, you could win a million pounds eventually, I was surprised it didn't go to series." Rosencrantz left ITV in 2006, and there has been a significant turnover in staff since the pilot was originally put together.

The show was launched by ITV and Syco at the Millennium Hotel Mayfair, London, on 3 May 2011. The initial recruitment phase for contestants lasted until 13 May. The updated format was conceived by Simon Cowell, who said that it was inspired by roulette and the story of Ashley Revell, who had bet his entire life savings on "red" in a roulette game in Las Vegas. It is the most expensive game show in history, at around £1.5m per episode. ITV's director of entertainment and comedy, Elaine Bedell, was contacted by Cowell, "This being Simon this was at 1.30 am, but even then it was quite a compelling idea". When later talking about the £1m prize on offer each night, Cowell said, "It's expensive if you have to give away a million every night but we have insurance for that."

Being a co-production between Syco TV and ITV Studios, Cowell began planning for international versions straight away, saying, "I'd love to take it around the world. I think the concept works. If it succeeds it will travel. We've got interest in America already." Some Syco-managed acts appeared on the show, including Leona Lewis on the first episode.

Domino's Pizza was announced as the primary sponsor of the show in June 2011, in a deal worth £1m. It had previously been the sponsor of Britain's Got Talent for three years. National Lottery operator Camelot Group were originally sought after to be the primary sponsors, but did not go ahead. A Camelot spokesperson said, "We were approached by Syco and worked with them and ITV on the Red or Black? concept. However, after discussions, we didn't reach an agreement on the venture."

ITV also signed deals with Jackpotjoy owner Gamesys to produce pay-to-play games for their website on an exclusive basis. Social TV company Monterosa were contracted to create a game that could be played by viewers online whilst watching the show, also allowing viewers to compete with their Facebook friends. Achievement badges could be unlocked by players, and if they managed to get through all ten rounds correctly, then they were awarded entry into the Red or Black? Millionaire's Club, normally reserved for those competitors who won the prize money themselves.
Cowell stated in an interview during the broadcast week of the first series that he hoped a second series would go ahead, and that he had received three separate approaches from the United States to create an American version. Peter Fincham, ITV's chief programmer, said in October 2011 that Red or Black? would only be recommissioned for a second series if some changes were made to the format.

Series 2 of Red or Black? was announced by Ant & Dec on 30 March 2012 during a radio programme appearance on The Chris Moyles Show. In order to reduce production costs, a new game was also introduced to replace the roulette wheel, which is called "The Vortex". In this game, the last contestant remaining must predict how long a ball will take to descend a 'mini velodrome'. If a contestant wins, he or she will receive a rolling jackpot starting at £500,000. This increases by £500,000 for the next show if the jackpot is not won.

Series 1

Format

Each episode of series 1 of Red or Black? consisted of 10 rounds; in each round, the player had to choose either red or black, with those who choose incorrectly being eliminated. The rounds were split into three stages. The first is an arena stage, which is recorded at Wembley Arena, which was named the "Red or Black Arena" during the show. 1,000 competitors are shown a spectacular stunt with either a red or a black competitor as the winning outcome, and then  have to decide which side will win. To do so, they take a seat at one of two special stands (Red or Black). The contenders who have correctly guessed the winner are given a fortune cookie - 256 of these cookies contain coloured stripes, with 128 of them being red, the other ones being black. After one of these colours gets selected, the players with the winning stripes (128 in total) move onto the location stage, where four more stunts will be shown, with the players have to guess the outcome of each of these stunts. After  each of the four games, the field of players will be cut in half. This means that, after the fourth location game, only eight competitors are left. Those eight then go forward to the live studio final, where they are reduced down to the final competitor, who has a chance to play for the £1m prize. The first series was broadcast over seven nights in September 2011, running over the course of a week, except for the Tuesday night, from Saturday to the following Saturday. Over 100,000 people applied to compete in the show.

In the penultimate round, "Duel", a video wall displayed a disc split into eight sections, numbered 1–8. Before the round started, an independent adjudicator randomised which sections were coloured red or black, with each colour having four sections; this choice was hidden to the contestants. A random player chose their colour, while the other player took the remaining colour. Each player then took it in turns to choose a number, with the corresponding section being revealed to the players and the audience. The first player to have all four of their sections revealed progressed to the final round.

The final game was a giant modified roulette wheel split into 36 alternately coloured sections (18 red and 18 black), awarding a £1 million prize if the player chose the correct colour. Red or Black? made its first millionaire in the first show, with bricklayer Nathan Hageman, from Reading, winning on red. The following night the second millionaire was made, with carer Kevin Cartwright also winning on red. Two further millionaires, Darren Thompson and Gary Brocklesby, were made during the series.

Rounds

Rounds included golfers Rory McIlroy and Lee Westwood, who were attempting to hit a gong in the middle of a lake from a distance of  near Eastnor Castle, Herefordshire; Jedward being launched in zorbing balls from JCBs; and boxers Amir Khan and David Haye competing in a round called "Shadowboxing". Location filming has taken place on the set of Coronation Street, where there was an issue with a round called "Fit to Burst" featuring actresses Michelle Keegan and Samia Smith who were spinning a wheel in order to burst balloons on a spike. Keegan won the round for her colour, but was subsequently disqualified for taking her hand off the wheel's handle, resulting in Smith winning for black. Other locations have included Alnwick Castle, Northumberland, and Battersea Power Station, where David Hasselhoff was fired into the air on a reverse bungee.

Episodes
The coloured backgrounds denote the result of each of the shows:
 – indicates the contestant won the whole show and chose the right colour in the final round and won £1 million.
 – indicates the contestant won the whole show but chose the wrong colour in the final round.

Series 2

Format
In series 2, the format consists of six rounds with eight contestants. This time, they do not have to choose their colour prior to the start of a round and can hold their nerve. In each of the first three rounds, the eight contestants watch a series of stunts, sporting challenges or performances. They'll then use their judgement to predict the outcome or have their powers of observation tested. Either way, the contestants must strike their buzzer and pick either red or black.

The first game takes place in the Red or Black? arena and subsequent games are held in the studio. After the first three rounds, the four players with the highest scores will move on to Part 2. If a tie occurs, the two or more players will play a tiebreaker round, "Power Bar", to decide who will move onto the second show.

The four remaining contestants participate in the next round, which involves celebrities (often singers). Then, the final two players will move on to the "Duel", played as it was during the first series, with the exception that the randomisation of each segment's colours is now shown briefly before being covered; and the game board now consists of 10 segments instead of 8. The competing pair will have to memorise the position of the jumbled up segments, then take it in turns to find their colour. The first to have all five of their colour revealed is the winner and advances to the new final round, "The Vortex".

The Vortex is "a true test of skill, nerve and judgment". It consists of a "mini velodrome" which flashes between red and black at a constant rate. The aim is to watch the sequence and adjust the power of the launcher, which will fire a ball into The Vortex. If the balls lands in the End Zone in the contestant's chosen colour, they win the jackpot (starting at £500,000), or else it will increase by £500,000 for the next show.

Rounds

Notes
: 'Spell Check' featured Jonathan Ross and Carol Vorderman as participants
: 'Roses' featured a dance performance by Derek Hough and Peta Murgatroyd
: 'Spin-off' featured Rizzle Kicks' performance of "Down with the Trumpets"
: 'Speed Darts' was played by Adrian Lewis and Phil Taylor

Episodes
The coloured backgrounds denote the result of each of the shows:
 – indicates the contestant won the whole show, chose the right colour in the final round and won the Jackpot.
 – indicates the contestant won the whole show but chose the wrong colour in the final round.
 – indicates a decision was reversed regarding the final round.

* Chris's loss on the Vortex was reversed after a review of a smaller camera underneath the Vortex that showed the ball dropping and landing milliseconds before the change in colour to red, thus the money was awarded to him – also note that the rollover still stood.

Reception

Ratings

Series 1
In the week prior to the launch of Red or Black?, ITV had slipped behind Channel 5 in the ratings on the Sunday night while BBC One had nearly three times the audience share of the ITV channel. While the lead was not as large on the remainder of the evenings, BBC One still beat ITV every night on the overall primetime audience share, except for Thursday night.

Red or Black? launched on Saturday 3 September 2011, with 6.41 million viewers, giving the show a 29.8% share of the market between 7 pm and 8:15 pm, beating the Doctor Who episode "Night Terrors" into second place with 5.54m. It returned later in the night with 6.93m. However the episode of The X Factor broadcast between the two episodes received a much higher number of viewers, attracting 10.51m. The second set of episodes, broadcast on the following night, showed a drop in ratings down to 4.47m for the first episode, and 5.55m for the second. The first episode of the night was beaten by an episode of Countryfile, which commanded 5.62m, while the second was beaten by another BBC show, Inspector George Gently, which attracted 6.47m.

The third pair of episodes, on the Monday evening, showed the series regaining some ground, with the first episode moving back up to 5.02m, and gaining a larger share of the market during its timeslot than any other channel. The second episode had lower ratings for the first time, with 4.99m, seeing it beaten by an episode of New Tricks on BBC One.

After a break on the Tuesday evening, the show returned on Wednesday whilst averaging 4.65m for the first show of the evening, a 21% audience share which was larger than anything else in its timeslot. The second episode broadcast at 9:30 pm, with 4.46m, an 18.7% share which was beaten by an episode of BBC One's Who Do You Think You Are? on Emilia Fox which commanded 5.39 million viewers. Ratings continued to decline on the Thursday evening shows, with both shows being viewed by fewer than four million viewers for the first time, 3.81m and 3.86m respectively, seeing the first show being beaten by BBC One's Watchdog which gained 5.23m in the 8 pm slot.

The sixth set of episodes also stayed below the 4 million mark, but in an evening that saw ITV beat BBC One's audience share in the evening by 19.6% to 19%, including the earlier episode of Red of Black? gaining 3.8m viewers, while the later show was viewed by slightly more with 3.9m. However, in direct competition with the later show was BBC One's Would I Lie to You? which had slightly more viewers, with 4m tuning in. On the return of Red or Black? to Saturday night, the show climbed above 4 million for the first time in three days, to 4.63m for the first show and then up to 5.67m for the second. This enabled ITV to beat BBC One in the primetime ratings overall, by 23.3% to 21%, even though the first episode of series 8 of Strictly Come Dancing was broadcast on BBC. However Red or Black? individually placed behind both Strictly and Doctor Who, with the overnights for the BBC shows being 7.6 and 6.0 million, respectively. Overall through the week the main ITV channel had a higher share of the ratings during primetime than BBC One on five out of the seven occasions, a turnaround from the previous week where it only won on a single evening.

Series 2
On 11–12 August 2012, the Saturday and Sunday prior to the launch of the second series of Red or Black?, ITV suffered the worst weekend in its 57-year history due to BBC One's coverage of the 2012 Summer Olympics; it was beaten to second place in the primetime league tables by BBC Three for the first time ever and the only ITV programme on 11 August that was one of the channel's 30 most watched in the week 6–12 August 2012 was the ITV News at Ten. The Olympics closing ceremony the following night gave BBC One more than 20 times the audience share of ITV. While the lead was nowhere near as large on the remainder of the evenings, BBC One still beat ITV every night on the overall primetime audience share, except for Thursday night.

Red or Black? launched its second series on 18 August 2012, with 3.25 million viewers, giving the show a 19.6% share of the market between 7 pm and 8:15 pm; it was beaten in its timeslot by a showing of Indiana Jones and the Kingdom of the Crystal Skull, which gained 4m on BBC One. It returned later in the night with 3.59m. The episode of The X Factor broadcast between the two episodes received a higher number of viewers, attracting 8.08m. The second set of episodes, broadcast the week after, saw a small rise in viewers with 3.42m for the first episode, and 3.70m for the second. In the third week, it got 3.30m for the first episode and 3.06m for the second. Week four brought in 3.17m for the first episode and 3.63m for the second. 3.29m people tuned in for week five's first episode and 3.25m for the second episode. Week six produced 3.39m for the first episode and 3.23m for the second. The final set of shows produced 3.23m and 2.84m viewers for the first and second episodes, respectively.

Critical response
Christopher Hooton, writing for the Metro, chose the show as one of his four weekend picks prior to the first episode. However, Rachel Tarley, writing for the same newspaper, later compared the show to It's a Knockout, but described the contestants as "morons" and said the show "marks a new era in Syco's lazy, sinister attempts to make money from a hopelessly stupid viewing public". Jim Shelley, of the Daily Mirror, described Red or Black? as "mess", and described the stunts as "dull"; Kevin O'Sullivan, also at the Mirror, described the show as a "sausage factory of sob stories"; while Ken Smith, of The Herald, described it as the "dullest show of the week". Jonathan Liew, of The Daily Telegraph, requested that readers stopped watching the show, whilst describing it as "so devoid of intellect that it actually sucks nearby intelligence into its vortex. This is, without exaggeration or embellishment, an abominably stupid television programme." Readers of UKGameshows.com named it the worst new game show of 2011 in their "Hall of shame" poll. On 26 October 2012, Richard Osman, writing for The Guardian, named Red or Black? among four of UK TV's worst ever gameshows.

During the airing of the first show, Twitter users complained that finalist Angel McKenzie had made it through, as she was previously a housemate during Big Brother 10 in 2009. However, McKenzie's appearance was overshadowed by stories relating to £1 million winner Nathan Hageman, as it was revealed that he had a criminal background. ITV had conducted a CRB check on each finalist towards the end of July, over a month prior to the first live show. When later discussing the incident, Simon Cowell said, "I'm not in a position to force anyone to do anything. Once he got through that's why he got the money, that's his own conscience what he decides to do with it."

Following the media frenzy about details of Hageman's offence, two contestants that had not yet appeared on the show were removed by ITV. It was revealed that one had failed to disclose that he had a criminal record during the application process, while information on the second contestant was withheld. A third contestant was subsequently removed by ITV. Each contestant was from a different night, with the first removed on the programme aired 7 September; however footage pre–filmed revealed his identity.

Transmissions

Awards and nominations

Notes

A ^ The first two rounds for each episode took place at Wembley Arena, rounds three to six took place on location, and the final four rounds were broadcast live from The Fountain Studios.

International versions
The first episode aired on 29 April 2012 on China Network Television with a top prize of 10,000 元.
The Ukrainian version / (/). It is based on the original British version, with 1000 contenders at the beginning of each show. The first episode aired on 10 November 2012 on Inter with a top prize of 1,000,000 ₴.
The Italian version of the show is entitled Red or Black? – Tutto o Niente and was aired on television channel Rai 1. This show was based on the second British version, with eight contenders competing against each other. The first episode aired on 22 February 2013 and the top prize was of 100.000 €.
Vietnam is the 4th country in the world that has the copyright of this game, with the name Trò chơi trời cho. 50 players will participate in 4 rounds of the program, with the answer "Red or Black" to receive the top prize of VND 50 million and a trip to Phu Quoc Island. The first episode airs on August 22, 2022 on VTV3.

References

External links

Red or Black Online Game

2010s British game shows
2011 British television series debuts
2012 British television series endings
Ant & Dec
English-language television shows
ITV game shows
Television series by ITV Studios